Chen Shuren (1884–1948) was a Chinese painter. Born Chen Zhe, he was renamed Chen Shao and also known by the art names De'an Laoren, Jiawai Yuzi, and Ershan Shanqiao, among others.

Born in  Mingjing, Panyu, Guangdong in 1884, Chen studied under painter Ju Lian. In 1903, Chen and two brothers, Gao Jianfu and Gao Qifeng, co-founded the Guangdong Daily. Together, the trio, known collectively by their surnames "Two Gous and one Chan" or as "The three greats of Lingnan", became leaders of the Lingnan school of painting, credited with popularizing the nihonga art style in China. Chen joined the Tongmenghui upon its establishment in 1905. In 1906, he left to attend art school in Kyoto, returning to China in 1912 after accepting a teaching position in Guangdong. He went back to Japan in 1913, enrolling at Rikkyo University. Upon completing his studies, Chen remained overseas, serving as secretary general of the Canadian branch of the Kuomintang. He became active in the Guangdong Kuomintang chapter in 1922, the same year he arrived in China. Chen became allied with Wang Jingwei between 1928 and 1931. From 1932 to 1947, Chen led the Overseas Chinese Affairs Commission. He withdrew politically from Wang, who led a Japan-friendly collaborationist government from 1940 to 1944.

References

1884 births
1948 deaths
19th-century Chinese painters
20th-century Chinese painters
Painters from Guangdong
Chinese expatriates in Canada
Cantonese people
Lingnan school painters
Artists from Guangzhou
Rikkyo University alumni
People from Panyu District